Tsentralny is a rural locality (a settlement) in Dobrinskoye Rural Settlement, Talovsky District, Voronezh Oblast, Russia. The population was 174 as of 2010. There are 4 streets.

References 

Rural localities in Talovsky District